Eloi Baribeau (December 1, 1906 – July 28, 1957) was a business owner and politician in Quebec. He served as mayor of Gatineau, Quebec from 1956 to 1957.

The son of former Gatineau mayor Théodore Baribeau and Lucia Lacroix, he was born in Lac-Sainte-Marie, Quebec and was educated at Bourget College in Rigaud. He moved to Gatineau Mills, later part of Gatineau, with his parents in 1928 and afterwards opened a service station there. In 1940, Baribeau married Lucienne Charron. He served nine years on Gatineau council before becoming mayor in 1956. Baribeau died in office when he drowned after falling out of a boat in Whitefish Lake near Gracefield.

References 

1957 deaths
1906 births
Mayors of Gatineau
Deaths by drowning in Canada
Accidental deaths in Quebec